Amblyxena is a genus of moths belonging to the family Coleophoridae. The genus was erected by Edward Meyrick in 1914.

Species
Amblyxena enopias Meyrick, 1914
Amblyxena pilifera Meyrick, 1921

References

Elachistidae
Monotypic moth genera